Edmond Beauchamp (3 March 1900 – 3 June 1985), sometimes credited only as Beauchamp, was a French film and Broadway stage actor. He appeared in 70 films between 1928 and 1979.

Partial filmography

 Misdeal (1928) - Le gitan (uncredited)
 Madame Bovary (1934) - Binet
 Un homme de trop à bord (1935)
 Roses noires (1935)
 Royal Waltz (1936) - Maps
 The Crime of Monsieur Lange (1936) - Priest in the Train (uncredited)
 La Bataille silencieuse (1937) - (uncredited)
 Feu ! (1937) - Moulay Aidi 
 Ballerina (1937) - L'inspecteur
 La femme du bout du monde (1938) - Charley
 La Marseillaise (1938) - Le curé Fayet
 Tamara la complaisantre (1938) - Borojski
 People Who Travel (1938) - (uncredited)
 Hercule (1938) - Le secrétaire de Vasco (uncredited)
 La Rue sans joie (1938) - (uncredited)
 L'ange que j'ai vendu (1938)
 La Maison du Maltais (1938) - Le policier (uncredited)
 The Novel of Werther (1938) - Le meurtrier
 Louise (1939) - Le philosophe
 Fire in the Straw (1939)
 Paradis perdu (1940) - Le facétieux (uncredited)
 The White Truck (1943) - Un gitan
 Le Val d'enfer (1943) - Rodrigo (uncredited)
 Un seul amour (1943) - Gardel
 Le Bossu (1944) - Le gaucher
 Twilight (1944) - Le jeune premier (uncredited)
 Le Père Goriot (1945) - (uncredited)
 The Last Metro (1945)
 Girl with Grey Eyes (1945)
 The Captain (1946) - Le procureur du roy
 The Sea Rose (1946) - Un mécanicien
 Le Visiteur (1946) - Ledru
 Devil in the Flesh (1947) - Le sommelier du grand restaurant
 Le Beau Voyage (1947) - Le marin solitaire sur la plage
 Les jeux sont faits (1947) - Dixonne
 L'Armoire volante (1948) - Le commissaire
 Pattes blanches (1949) - Le gendarme (uncredited)
 Meurtres ? (1950) - Le professeur Le Gossec
 Mr. Peek-a-Boo (1951) - Arturo
 Le Garçon sauvage (1951) - Gilles
 Crimson Curtain (1952) - Un acteur
 La Chair et le Diable (1954)
 School for Love (1955) - M. Petersen - père d'Elis
 If Paris Were Told to Us (1956) - Un consommateur (uncredited)
 Marie Antoinette Queen of France (1956) - Comte de Luxembourg
 The Hunchback of Notre Dame (1956) - Bit part (uncredited)
 Le Beau Serge (1958) - Glomaud
 Le maître du Pérou (1958)
 Le petit prof (1959) - Le grand-père
 Le Bossu (1959) - Don Miguel
 Captain Blood (1960) - Le gouverneur de la Province
 A Man Named Rocca (1961) - l'avocat de Xavier
 Les Cracks (1968) - Le vétéran
 Le Prussien (1971, TV Movie) - Le 'Prussien'
 Figaro-ci, Figaro-là (1972, TV Movie) - Paris-Duverney

References

External links

1900 births
1985 deaths
French male film actors
Actors from Montpellier
20th-century French male actors